The Del Mar Juvenile Turf Stakes is a Grade II American Thoroughbred horse race for two-year-olds over a distance of one mile on the turf track scheduled annually in September at Del Mar Racetrack in Del Mar, California. The event currently carries a purse of $100,000.

History

The inaugural running of the event was on September 5, 2012, as the Oak Tree Juvenile Turf Stakes. Del Mar added two new juvenile turf stakes to its schedule in conjunction with the Oak Tree Racing Association during their 2012 meeting. The Oak Tree Racing Association had been idle since 2010. The races, meant as stepping stones toward the two Breeders’ Cup's juvenile grass offerings, also expand the track's emphasis on its 2-year-old program.

In 2015 Del Mar administration renamed the event to the Del Mar Juvenile Turf Stakes after Oak Tree Racing Association moved their meeting to the Alameda County Fairgrounds in Pleasanton. 

In 2022 the American Graded Stakes Committee upgraded the classification of the event to Grade III.

The best performance by a winner of this event in the Breeders' Cup Juvenile Turf was in 2021 when Mackinnon finished third.

Records
Speed record: 
1 mile: 1:34.36 – Diamond Bachelor (2013)

Margins:
 lengths – Packs A Wahlop (2022)

Most wins by a jockey:
 No jockey has won the event more than once

Most wins by a trainer:
 2 – John W. Sadler (2014, 2019)

Most wins by an owner:
 2 – Hronis Racing (2014, 2019)

Winners

Legend:

See also
 List of American and Canadian Graded races

References

Del Mar Racetrack
Horse races in California
Flat horse races for two-year-olds
Graded stakes races in the United States
Recurring sporting events established in 2012
2012 establishments in California
Grade 3 stakes races in the United States
Turf races in the United States